Femme est la nuit is a 1977 album by Dalida.

Track listing
 Femme est la nuit
 Comme si tu revenais d'un long voyage
 Il y a toujours une chanson
 Les clefs de l'amour
 Captain Sky
 Amoureuse de la vie
 Tables séparées
 Comme si tu étais là
 Voyages sans bagages
 Et tous ces regards

Singles
1977 Captain Sky
1977 Amoureuse de la vie / Femme est la nuit

See also
 Dalida
 List of Dalida songs
 Dalida albums discography
 Dalida singles discography

References
 Dalida Official Website

External links
 Dalida Official Website "Discography" section

Dalida albums
1977 albums